The Lyulka AL-7 was a turbojet designed by Arkhip Mikhailovich Lyulka and produced by his Lyulka design bureau. The engine was produced between 1954 and 1970.

Design and development
The AL-7 had supersonic airflow through the first stage of the compressor. TR-7 prototype, developing 6,500 kgf (14,330 lbf, 63.7 kN) of thrust, was tested in 1952, and the engine was initially intended for Ilyushin's Il-54 bomber. The afterburning AL-7F version was created in 1953. In April 1956, the Sukhoi S-1 prototype, equipped with the AL-7F, exceeded Mach 2 at 18,000 m (70,900 ft), which led to the production of the Su-7 'Fitter' and Su-9 'Fishpot', equipped with this engine. Later, the engine was adopted for the Tu-128 'Fiddler' in 1960, and for the AS-3 'Kangaroo' cruise missile. The Beriev Be-10 jet flying boat used a non-afterburning AL-7PB with stainless steel compressor blades.

Variants
AL-7Non-afterburning military turbojet.
Al-7F Afterburning versions of the AL-7F, typically, the AL-7F1-100 used in the Sukhoi T-49.

Specifications (AL-7F)

See also

References

Notes

Bibliography

 Gunston, Bill. World Encyclopedia of Aero Engines. Cambridge, England. Patrick Stephens Limited, 1989.

External links

 AL-7 on LeteckeMotory.cz (cs)

AL-7
1950s turbojet engines